Llangwyryfon is a village and community in the county of Ceredigion, Wales. It lies on the B4576 about 8 miles to the south and east of Aberystwyth. The village lies in the valley of the River Wyre and contains the roadbridge where the B4576 crosses the Wyre downstream of which lies the confluence of the rivers Beidiog and the Wyre. The name Llangwyryfon derives from the tale of Saint Ursula to whom the village church is dedicated. Llan is Welsh for church and the gwyryddon are the 11,000 virgins who Ursula was martyred along with.

Llangwyryfon has boundaries with Llanrhystud, Llanilar, Dyffryn Arth, Llangeitho and Lledrod communities

History
There is an Iron Age site in the village at Caer Argoed. In 1942(?) an early medieval, 5th-6th century carved stone was found in a field in the village by a farmer ploughing the field.

Amenities
There is a general store in the village as well as a church and a chapel.

Clubs and societies
Young Farmers Club
Women's Institute
Merched Y Wawr
Gardening Club
Youth Club

Transport
The village is served by the 588 bus service which runs between Aberystwyth and Lampeter.

Education

Llangwyryfon Community Primary School is located in the village. In 2007 the School had 42 pupils.

Cylch Meithrin Llangwyryfon is a playgroup in Llangwyryfon registered by the Mudiad Ysgolion Meithrin. The group is based in the Community Hall, Neuadd Santes Ursula (English: Saint Ursula Hall), near the Church.

Llangwyryfon is in the catchment area of the two secondary schools in Aberystwyth, Penweddig Community Secondary School (Welsh: Ysgol Gyfun Gymunedol Penweddig) and Penglais School.

Industry
The main industry in the area is livestock farming.
There is a scrapyard in the village.
Llangwyryfon Wind Farm is split between Llangwyryfon and Lledrod, it is a wind farm of 20 wind turbines.

References

Villages in Ceredigion